Cyrus Broacha is an Indian TV anchor, theatre personality, comedian, political satirist, columnist, podcaster and author. He is also a prankster, best known for his show Bakra on MTV and his show The Week That Wasn't on CNN-News18 (formerly CNN-IBN). He also provided the voiceover as Angada in the cartoon film Ramayana.

Early years

Broacha was born on 7 August 1971, to a Parsi father and Catholic mother. He started acting at the age of five in a school play, The Emperor's New Clothes. Every year he performed and wrote for the school magazine, winning prizes for English and drama.

Cyrus's family hails from modern day Pakistan,  moving from Rawalpindi to Mumbai after the Partition of India.

Career
When Broacha was 15, he acted in his first Hindi film, Jalwa which released in 1987 with Pankaj Parashar, starring alongside Naseeruddin Shah. The next year, he did his first professional play, Brighton Beach Memoirs, under Pearl Padamsee. The press hailed him as a child prodigy, and his career in acting took off. He continued acting in plays.

He also came into the limelight during his college's Malhar festival. When he was in college, FM radio took off in India, and he gained a reputation as a radio jockey.

After graduation, Broacha went to the Lee Strasberg Theatre and Film Institute in New York City where he studied acting for theatre. After returning to India, he acted in many commercials, television serials and plays. He also hosted shows and corporate events, while pursuing his passion of theatre with over 20 commercial theatre productions.

MTV
His popularity had MTV seeking him. As an anchor with them, his reputation grew as he became MTV's main face. He has interviewed Hindi film industry stars including Amitabh Bachchan and Shah Rukh Khan. His candid-camera show is MTV Bakra.

Host
Broacha has hosted many cricket shows including the popular Chevrolet Cricket Show on Ten Sports, and has interviewed nearly every cricketer from every generation.

He anchors a news satire and comedy show, The Week That Wasn't on CNN-IBN, co-written and directed by friend Kunal Vijaykar. He presents the show Faking News on IBN 7, directed by his friend Vijayakar.

He led India's "Rock the Vote" campaign and represented MTV at the UNAIDS conference in Hanover, Germany. He moderated the Indian segment of Be Heard - A Global Discussion With Colin Powell in February 2002.

He appeared on Sony Entertainment Television's hit show Jhalak Dikhhla Jaa, India's version of Dancing with the Stars, and Fear Factor – Khatron Ke Khiladi Level 3 on Colors TV.

He is also a columnist who writes for two leading national papers and two magazines. He hosts an annual show called Greenathon on NDTV.

He is currently the editor and host of a cricket analysis series called ESPNcricinfo Runorder, a bi-weekly show featuring former cricketers like Agarkar, Tait, and Hogg.

Actor

Broacha has acted in the following Hindi movies:

 Jalwa
 99
 Little Zizou
 Fruit and Nut
 Mumbai Chakachak
 The Shaukeens
 Roy

Author

In January 2010, he released his book Karl, Aaj aur Kal, a semi-autobiographical comedy about celebrities, Bollywood and politics. In 2011, he released another book, The Average Indian Male, which is a riotous account of the Indian male commonly referred to as the "aam aadmi".

Podcaster
In 2015, he started hosting a podcast called Cyrus says which got renamed to C& Bull, produced by IVM network. This is a show on life in urban India, politics, sports, civic sense and current affairs.

Personal life

Cyrus Broacha is married to Ayesha, a photographer. The couple have a son Mikhaail and a daughter Maya.

References

External links

Cyrus Says podcast

Indian VJs (media personalities)
Indian television presenters
Indian male comedians
1971 births
Living people
St. Xavier's College, Mumbai alumni
Lee Strasberg Theatre and Film Institute alumni
Male actors in Hindi cinema
Male actors from Mumbai
Parsi people
Parsi people from Mumbai
Fear Factor: Khatron Ke Khiladi participants